Emmet Swimming (who write their name as "emmet swimming") is a rock band from Fairfax, Virginia that was formed in 1990 at George Mason University.
The band's name is a misspelled reference to Emmett Till, who died after being shot and thrown into a river. "The idea of the name was basically that a 14-year-old boy should be swimming in the river, not dying in it," said singer/founder Todd Watts.
"Emmet Swimming" is also the name of an early song the band wrote. The band recently sold out (1,200 tickets) their performance at the 930 Club celebrating their 30th show at the club which puts them in the top 7 of bands that have ever played there.

They are known for their extensive touring. Regularly sold-out performances at the Fairfax live-music staples Planet NOVA, TT Reynolds and Fat Tuesday's drew major record label attention culminating in a deal with Epic/Sony and the band continuously toured for over seven years, performing 200–300 shows per year. They played on the 1998 H.O.R.D.E. tour, and have also played and toured with Dave Matthews Band and Barenaked Ladies, and Charlotte NC band Galaxy Girl.

They still regularly play venues such as the 9:30 Club (including a show there in the summer of 2018 that sold out in 2 days) in Washington, DC and the Tally Ho Theater in Leesburg, VA.  They have a large following of loyal fans who pack the house for their shows.  The band has sold over 250,000 albums and has been nominated for 14 Washington Area Music Awards (WAMMIES).

Band members

Current members
 Todd Watts – vocals, guitar
 Erik Wenberg – guitar, vocals
 Scott Brotemarkle (Therm) – bass guitar
 Tamer Eid – drums

Former members
 Jim McNabb – bass guitar
 John Alexander – guitar
 Rob Shaw – bass guitar
 Luke Michel – bass guitar
 Derrick Decker – drums

Discography

Studio albums
 this kid walks into a bar... (2013)
 Bathing in the New Economy (EP) (2003)
 Big Night Without You (1998)
 Arlington to Boston (1996)
 wake (Epic) (1995)
 wake (1994)
 dark when the snow falls (1993)

Live albums
 Earplugs 50¢ (1999)

References

External links
 Band's official website
 emmet swimming collection on the Internet Archive's live music archive
 Setlist archives

American folk rock groups
Musical groups from Virginia